Richland is an unincorporated community in Oconee County, South Carolina, United States. Richland has a post office with ZIP code 29675.

References

Unincorporated communities in Oconee County, South Carolina
Unincorporated communities in South Carolina